Duders Point is located on the North Shore of Auckland, New Zealand. It is a small peninsula near Devonport. The area is mostly residential. It sticks out into Ngataringa Bay between Stanley Bay and Bayswater, and surrounded by mudflats and mangrove forests.  
Suburbs of Auckland
Populated places around the Waitematā Harbour